The Directors Guild of America Award for Outstanding Directorial Achievement in Variety/Talk/News/Sports – Specials is one of the annual Directors Guild of America Awards given by the Directors Guild of America. It was first awarded at the 66th Directors Guild of America Awards in 2014.

Winners and nominees

2010s

2020s

Individuals with multiple awards
5 awards
 Glenn Weiss

Individuals with multiple nominations

8 nominations
 Glenn Weiss

3 nominations
 Hamish Hamilton
 Louis J. Horvitz
 Stan Lathan
 Linda Mendoza

2 nominations
 Ian Berger
 Tim Mancinelli
 Beth McCarthy-Miller
 Marcus Raboy

Total awards by network
 CBS – 6
 ABC – 2
 HBO Max – 1
 NBC – 1

See also
 Directors Guild of America Award for Outstanding Directing – Variety Series

References

External links
 Official DGA website

Directors Guild of America Awards